David Goodwin Barr (June 15, 1895  September 26, 1970) was a US Army major general who took part in World War I, World War II, Chinese Civil War and Korean War. Barr thought poorly of the Republic of China and often came into conflict with Chinese leader Chiang Kai-shek. During the Korean War, he led the 7th Infantry Division and was defeated by Chinese Communist troops in the Battle of Chosin Reservoir. Later, he was removed from post by Matthew Ridgway. Following the war, he was appointed the commandant of United States Army Armor School. Barr is buried at Arlington National Cemetery.

See also
Barr Memorial Library at Fort Knox, Kentucky was named after him.

References

External links

David Goodwin Bar at ArlingtonCemetery.net, an unofficial website
Generals of World War II

United States Army personnel of World War I
People from Marengo County, Alabama
United States Army personnel of the Korean War
United States Army Command and General Staff College alumni
United States Army War College alumni
Recipients of the Silver Star
Burials at Arlington National Cemetery
United States Army generals of World War II
United States Army generals